Ono Academic College (in Hebrew: הקריה האקדמית אונו) is a private college located in Kiryat Ono, Israel with over 18,000 students. With its vision of bridging economic and cultural gaps in Israeli society, the college attracts Druze, Bedouin, Palestinians, Ethiopian-Israelis, ultra-Orthodox Jews, and special needs students.

History
Ono Academic College was founded in 1995 by Ranan Hartman, son of rabbi and philosopher David Hartman, with the goal of opening up the country's higher education system to populations that are perceived as  marginalized. 

The college was initially affiliated with the University of Manchester before becoming an Israeli school fully accredited by the Council for Higher Education in Israel. Starting out in a single trailer with 100 law and business students, enrollment has risen to 18,000 students at five campuses around the country: Kiryat Ono, Jerusalem, Haifa, Netanya and Or Yehuda. The school offers 47 programs of study.

OAC's satellite campuses in Or Yehuda and Jerusalem offer programs geared toward the Haredi Jewish population, allowing men and women to attend classes on different days, while  Muslim, Christian and Jewish religious leaders attend classes together in a special joint program in law. The college also has a substantial enrollment of Ethiopian-Israelis.In the early days of the school, after Hartman was asked by the Jewish Agency to accept an Ethiopian student to the law school, he arranged for scholarships for needy Ethiopian immigrants, and over 1,000 Ethiopian students have graduated from the institution, including Pnina Tamano-Shata, the first Ethiopian born woman to join the Knesset and become a government minister.

In 2012, OAC opened a special  track for students with Asperger Syndrome that offers a bachelor's degree in business administration. The school also offers a specialized B.A. program for Druze women.The Center for Academic Accessibility provides assistance to special needs students to assure that individuals with disabilities are not barred from obtaining academic degrees.In 2013, the college established Ro'im Rachok, a 4-month training course which prepares young adults with autism for service in the Israel Defense Forces.

In 2016, the college opened the Jonathan Wohl School of Music headed by Israel Prize laureate Noam Sheriff. At the dedication ceremony Sheriff spoke about the universal language of music and how this fit in with the goals of the college.   

In 2021, the college announced plans to expand its campus, connecting the campuses in Kiryat Ono and Or Yehuda. The campus, stretching over 13 dunams, will incorporate academic buildings, offices, dormitories and commercial areas. This will allow the ultra-Orthodox and secular campuses to operate side by side.

Faculties

 Faculty of Law
 Faculty of Business Administration
 Faculty of Health Professions
 Faculty of Humanities and Social Sciences
 Faculty of Marketing Communications
 Jonathan Wohl School of Music

Degrees awarded

 LL.B. (Bachelor of Laws)
 LL.M. (Master of Laws)
 B.Sc. in Computer Science
 B.A. in Business Administration
 M.B.A. in Business Administration
 M.A. in Medical Case Management
 M.A. in Interdisciplinary Medical and Rehabilitation Science
 B.A. in Advertising and Marketing Communications
 M.A. in Digital Strategy and Marketing Communication
 B.A. in Communication Sciences and Disorders
 B.S.N. in Nursing
 B.O.T. in Occupational Therapy
 B.A. in Education and Social Studies
 M.A. in Education
 M.A. in Jewish Studies
 B.A. in Land of Israel and Jerusalem Studies
 B.Mus. in Music
 B.Sc. in Sports Therapy

International cooperation
Ono Academic College and the Center for Israeli Legal Studies at Columbia Law School hosts visiting faculty from Israel, sponsors lectures and offers fellowships and exchange opportunities. 

In June 2017, the Shalom Comparative Legal Research Center at Ono Academic College hosted a week-long legal seminar for undergraduate students focused on labor law, intellectual property, equality, and the challenges that innovative technologies pose to the law at Yale Law School, New York University School of Law, and Fordham University School of Law.In late 2017, the Shalom Comparative Legal Research Center at Ono Academic College collaborated  with the World Intellectual Property Organization (WIPO) in Geneva and the Swiss Center for Comparative Research in Lausanne to organize a three-day seminar on innovations in intellectual property law.

Multicultural projects
In an attempt to integrate students from different population groups, the college offers a creative writing project in Arabic and Hebrew, a weekly phone-in program to establish rapport between secular and ultra-Orthodox women, and a talk program led by Jewish and Muslim religious leaders to discuss ways of bridging the conflict.

Controversy
Ono College has been criticized for its policy of gender segregation for students from the ultra-orthodox community. According to Haaretz newspaper, Jews and Arabs attend separate classes, although Arab students who are proficient in Hebrew have a choice of studying with the Jews or joining an Arab class.The college has also been criticized for budgetary irregularities and inflated salaries. 

In 2019, the College instituted a recovery program that reduced teaching hours, lowered hourly payments and cut administrative personnel.

Notable faculty
Gabriela Shalev, Rector of Ono Academic College, former Israeli ambassador to the United Nations
Noam Sheriff, Dean of Jonathan Wohl School of Music, Music Director of the Israel Chamber Orchestra
Shai Piron, Dean of Social Development, Former Israeli Minister of Education
Shira Yalon-Chamovitz, Dean of Students, Director of the Israel Institute on Cognitive Accessibility 
Shmuel Hauser, Chairman of the Israeli Securities Authority
Tova Hartman, Dean of Humanities
Yechiel Leiter, Jewish political philosophy
Yaron Zelekha, Former Israeli Ministry of Finance accountant general
 Elizabeth DePoy, disability theorist
Khaled Kabub, Israeli Supreme Court judge
Gabriel Hallevy, professor of law

Notable alumni
Rachel Adato, Former Member of Knesset 
Itamar Ben-Gvir, Member of Knesset 
Amnon Cohen, Former Member of Knesset 
Gila Gamliel, Member of Knesset, Former Deputy Minister in the Prime Minister's Office
Nurit Koren, Former member of Knesset 
Bezalel Smotrich, Member of Knesset 
Pnina Tamano-Shata, First Ethiopian-Israeli woman to win a Knesset seat, Member of Knesset 
 Omer Yankelevich, Member of Knesset, Minister of Diaspora Affairs

See also 
List of universities and colleges in Israel
Education in Israel
Ono Academic College - Haredi Campus

References

External links 
 Official website in English
Muslim couple receives MA in Jewish Studies
President Hayut reveals: This is my ultra-Orthodox advisor 
The challenges of multiculturalism in Israel’s shared society

 
Colleges in Israel
Education in Tel Aviv District
Law schools in Israel